Da Hood (slang for "the neighborhood") usually refers to an underclass big-city neighborhood, with high crime rates, low-income housing and a general mentality of despair and hopelessness. It may also refer to:

 Da Hood (album), a 1995 album by the Menace Clan
 A rap group signed to Hoo-Bangin' Records
 A rap supergroup; see Mack 10 Presents da Hood
 "Da Hood", a song by Da Youngsta's from the 1993 album The Aftermath

See also